Lisa Baker may refer to:
Lisa Baker (Australian politician) (born 1958)
Lisa Baker (Pennsylvania politician)
Lisa Baker, Playboy Playmate of the Month for November 1966, and Playmate of the Year for 1967